The Shadow is an underground newspaper published in the Lower East Side of New York City since 1989. The paper focuses on investigative journalism.

Founding 
The Shadow is an anarchist newspaper. It was founded in 1989 reaction to the way that events in the Lower East Side, including the Tompkins Square Park Riot, were covered by mainstream media. It also grew out of a long tradition of underground press in New York City's Lower East Side. The newspaper was founded by Chris Flash. Paul DeRienzo and Frank Morales have been contributing writers.

Activities 
The newspaper has focused on issues central to the Lower East Side including squats, gentrification, and struggles against placing a curfew on Tomkins Square Park. It paused publishing in 2008 and returned in August, 2013.

In addition to publishing a newspaper, Chris Flash and The Shadow have organized concerts in Tompkins Square Park.

External links 
Shadow website

Notes 

Underground press
Newspapers published in New York City